Growing Pains is a 1928 Our Gang short silent comedy film directed by Anthony Mack. It was the 77th Our Gang short that was released and is considered to have been lost in the 1965 MGM vault fire.

Cast

The Gang
 Mary Ann Jackson as Mary Ann
 Bobby Hutchins as Wheezer
 Joe Cobb as Joe
 Jackie Condon as Jackie
 Jean Darling as Jean
 Allen Hoskins as Farina
 Jay R. Smith as Jay
 Harry Spear as Harry
 Pete the Pup as Pansy

Additional cast
 John Aasen as Circus giant

See also
 Our Gang filmography

References

External links

1928 films
1928 comedy films
1928 short films
1928 lost films
American silent short films
American black-and-white films
Films directed by Robert A. McGowan
Lost American films
Metro-Goldwyn-Mayer short films
Our Gang films
Lost comedy films
1920s American films
Silent American comedy films
1920s English-language films